Embrach-Rorbas railway station is a railway station in the Swiss canton of Zurich and municipality of Embrach. The station takes its name from that municipality, and the adjoining municipality of Rorbas. It is located on the Winterthur to Koblenz line, and is served by Zurich S-Bahn line S41.

References

External links 
 

Embrach-Rorbas
Embrach-Rorbas